Victor Villaseñor is an American writer, best known for the national bestselling book Rain of Gold. Villaseñor's works are often taught in American schools. He went on to write Thirteen Senses: A Memoir (2001), a continuation of Rain of Gold. His book Burro Genius: A Memoir (2004) describes his life. The author has received awards and endorsements, including an appointment to serve as the founding Steinbeck Chair at Hartnell College and the National Steinbeck Center in Salinas, from February 2003 to March 2004.

Lecturing
Villaseñor is also a public speaker, giving lectures with his candid perspective on a number of universal themes, including pride in heritage, strength of family, the power of the written word, dedication to education and personal achievement, and world peace.

He founded the non-profit organization Snowgoose Global Thanksgiving to help promote peace and harmony throughout the world. Villaseñor's self-published book, Snow Goose: Global Thanksgiving, describes his philosophy toward that eventuality.

Victor Villaseñor lives on the ranch where he grew up, in Oceanside, California. He is Mexican-American.

See also
 List of Mexican American writers

Bibliography
 Macho!, Houston: Arte Publico Press, 1991 edition .
 Rain of Gold, Houston: Arte Publico Press, 1991 .
 Wild Steps of Heaven, New York: Delacorte Press, 1996 .
 Thirteen Senses: A Memoir, New York: Rayo, 2001 .
 Burro Genius: A Memoir, New York: Rayo, 2006 .
 The Frog and His Friends Save Humanity (La Rana y Sus Amigos Salvan a la Humanidad), (Spanish translation Edna Ochoa), Houston: Pinata Books/Arte Publico Press, 2005 .
 Lion Eyes, Random House Digital, Inc., 2008 .
 Crazy Loco Love, Houston: Arte Publico Press, 2008 .

Bibliographical Resources
https://faculty.ucmerced.edu/mmartin-rodriguez/index_files/vhVillasenorVictor.htm

References

External links

 Victor Villasenor Official Website
 El Paso Public Library - Archives of Past Events
 Snowgoose Global Thanksgiving Website
 ReadingGroupGuides - Excerpt from Thirteen Senses: A Memoir
  at Sonoma State University

1940 births
Living people
20th-century American novelists
21st-century American novelists
American male novelists
American memoirists
American writers of Mexican descent
People from Carlsbad, California
Hispanic and Latino American novelists
American male short story writers
20th-century American short story writers
21st-century American short story writers
20th-century American male writers
21st-century American male writers
Novelists from California
20th-century American non-fiction writers
21st-century American non-fiction writers
American male non-fiction writers